Ristella travancorica, commonly known as the Travancore cat skink or the Travancore ristella, is a species of skink endemic to the Western Ghats in India.

Description

Ear-opening not or but slightly larger than the nostril; third to sixth upper labials below the eye. Dorsal scales sharply bicarinate; 24, rarely 26, scales round the middle of the body. Otherwise as in R. rurkii. Reddish brown above, each dorsal scale usually with a dark brown dot; usually a rather indistinct darker lateral band; lower surfaces uniform whitish. From snout to vent .

Geographic range
R. travancorica is found in India, in the Western Ghats, in the Ponmudi Hills (western Tamil Nadu state), and the Tirunelveli Hills (Kerala state).

Reproduction
This species is oviparous. Egg laying coincides with the southwestern monsoons. Adult females lay clutches of 2 eggs under dead leaves and rocks. Each egg measures  x .

Notes

References
 Beddome RH. 1870. Descriptions of some new lizards from the Madras Presidency. Madras Monthly J. Med. Sci. 1: 30–35. (Ateuchosaurus travancoricus, p. 33).
 Boulenger GA. 1887. Catalogue of the Lizards in the British Museum (Natural History). Second Edition. Volume III., ... Scincidæ, ... London: Trustees of the British Museum (Natural History). (Taylor and Francis, printers). xii + 575 pp. + Plates I – XL. (Ristella travancorica, p. 358 + Plate XXIX, Figures 2, 2a).
 Smith MA. 1935. The Fauna of British India, Including Ceylon and Burma. Reptilia and Amphibia. Vol. II.—Sauria. London: Secretary of State for India in Council. (Taylor and Francis, printers). xiii + 440 pp. + Plate I + 2 maps. (Ristella travancorica, pp. 331–332).

Ristella
Reptiles described in 1870
Taxa named by Richard Henry Beddome